The 1828 United States presidential election in Missouri took place between October 31 and December 2, 1828, as part of the 1828 United States presidential election. Voters chose three representatives, or electors to the Electoral College, who voted for President and Vice President.

Missouri voted for the Democratic candidate, Andrew Jackson, over the National Republican candidate, John Quincy Adams. Jackson won Missouri by a margin of 41.28%.

Results

See also
 United States presidential elections in Missouri

References

Missouri
1828
1828 Missouri elections